The Computer Pioneer Award was established in 1981 by the Board of Governors of the IEEE Computer Society to recognize and honor the vision of those people whose efforts resulted in the creation and continued vitality of the computer industry. The award is presented to outstanding individuals whose main contribution to the concepts and development of the computer field was made at least fifteen years earlier.
The recognition is engraved on a silver medal specially struck for the Society.

This award has now been renamed to "Women of the ENIAC Computer Pioneer Award".

Award types
The award has two types of recipients:
 Computer Pioneer Charter Recipients - At the inauguration of this award, the individuals who already meet the Computer Pioneer Award criteria and also have received IEEE Computer Society awards prior to 1981.
 Computer Pioneer Recipients - Awarded annually since 1981.

Computer Pioneer Charter Recipients

 Howard H. Aiken - Large-Scale Automatic Computation
 Samuel N. Alexander - SEAC
 Gene M. Amdahl - Large-Scale Computer Architecture
 John W. Backus - FORTRAN
 Robert S. Barton - Language-Directed Architecture
 C. Gordon Bell - Computer Design
 Frederick P. Brooks, Jr. - Compatible Computer Family System/IBM 360
 Wesley A. Clark - First Personal Computer
 Fernando J. Corbato - Timesharing
 Seymour R. Cray - Scientific Computer Systems
 Edsger W. Dijkstra - Multiprogramming Control
 J. Presper Eckert - First All-Electronic Computer: ENIAC
 Jay W. Forrester - First Large-Scale Coincident Current Memory
 Herman H. Goldstine - Contributions to Early Computer Design
 Richard W. Hamming - Error-correcting code
 Jean A. Hoerni - Planar Semiconductor Manufacturing Process
 Grace M. Hopper - Automatic Programming
 Alston S. Householder - Numerical Methods
 David A. Huffman 	- Sequential Circuit Design
 Kenneth E. Iverson - APL
 Tom Kilburn - Paging Computer Design
 Donald E. Knuth - Science of Computer Algorithms
 Herman Lukoff - Early Electronic Computer Circuits
 John W. Mauchly - First All-Electronic Computer: ENIAC
 Gordon E. Moore - Integrated Circuit Production Technology
 Allen Newell - Contributions to Artificial Intelligence
 Robert N. Noyce - Integrated Circuit Production Technology
 Lawrence G. Roberts - Packet Switching
 George R. Stibitz - First Remote Computation
 Shmuel Winograd - Efficiency of Computational Algorithms
 Maurice V. Wilkes - Microprogramming
 Konrad Zuse - First Process Control Computer
 See external list of Computer Pioneer Charter Recipients

Computer Pioneer Recipients
Source: IEEE Computer Society

Nomination process 
All members of the profession are invited to nominate a colleague who they consider most eligible to be considered for this award. The nomination deadline is 15 October of each year.
 Nomination process

See also 
 List of pioneers in computer science
 List of computer science awards
 List of computer-related awards
 List of awards named after people

References

External links 
 IEEE Computer Society Awards
 IEEE Computer Pioneer Award

Awards established in 1981
Computer science awards
Systems sciences awards
IEEE society and council awards
Systems sciences organizations